Luciano Federico (born 28 August 1968, in Sanremo) is an Italian actor. He starred in the 1998 film, Radiofreccia.

Selected filmography
Una piccola storia, directed by Stefano Chiantini (2007)
L'Ex-femme de ma vie, directed by Josiane Balasko (2005)
The Passion, directed by Mel Gibson (2004)
Il segreto del successo (2003)
Forse sì, forse no, directed by Stefano Chiantini (2002)
Malèna, Italo-German film directed by Giuseppe Tornatore (2000)
Il diario di Matilde Manzoni, directed by Lino Capolicchio (2002)
800 balas, directed by Alex de la Iglesia (2002)
L'ultima lezione, directed by Fabio Rosi (2001)
Senza filtro, directed by Mimmo Raimondi (2001)
Fughe da Fermo, directed by Edoardo Nesi (2000)
A Love, directed by Gianluca Maria Tavarelli (1999)
Radiofreccia, directed by Luciano Ligabue (1998)
Naja (1997)
Un paradiso di bugie (1997)
La classe non è acqua, directed by Cecilia Calvi (1995)
Padre e figlio, directed by Pasquale Pozzessere (1994)
Fratelli e sorelle, directed by Pupi Avati (1992)
Ambrogio, directed by Wilma Labate (1992)

References

External links
 

1968 births
Living people
People from Sanremo
Italian male film actors